Jingxi (Zhuang: Cingsae Si) is a county-level city of western Guangxi, China. It is under the administration of Baise City.

Administrative divisions
There are 8 towns and 11 townships in the district:

Towns:
Xinjing (新靖镇), Huadong (化峒镇), Hurun (湖润镇), Ande (安德镇), Youlin (龙临镇), Quyang (渠洋镇), Yuexu (岳圩镇), Longbang, Wuping (武平)

Townships:
Tongde Township (同德乡), Qianzhuang Township (壬庄乡), Anning Township (安宁乡), Dizhou Township (地州乡), Ludong Township (禄峒乡), Nanpo Township (南坡乡), Tianpan Township (吞盘乡), Guole Township (果乐乡), Xinjia Township (新甲乡), Kuixu Township (魁圩乡)

Demographics
Jingxi's population was 605,100 (2010). 99.71% of the people belong to the Zhuang ethnic group. The rest include Han, Yao, Miao, and other ethnic groups.

Languages
David Holm (2010) lists the following Zhuang dialects of Jingxi County, and provides comparative word lists for them as well. Holm (2010) notes that Zhuang dialects have not diversified gradually within Jingxi County, but are the results of mass migrations from other parts of Guangxi and even from Vietnam during the past several centuries.
Yang 洋/佯: Lingua franca of Jingxi County, spoken in county seat and most towns.
Nong 儂 (Nung): spoken in villages around the county seat. It has more conservative phonology than Yang, although Nong is closely related to Yang.
Zong 宗 (Tsung): in Longlin 龍臨, Sanhe 三合, Guole 果樂, and Nanpo 南坡 townships.
Long’an 儂安 (Nung’an): in Longlin 龍臨, Sanhe 三合, Dajia 大甲, and Dadao 大道 townships. Northern Tai.
Sheng 省 (Seng): in Wuping 武平, Sanhe, Ande 安德, and Nanpo 南坡 (Dingjin 定金) townships. Northern Tai.
Rui 銳 (Yui): in Quyang 渠洋, Longlin 龍臨, and Kuixu 魁墟 townships.
Zuozhou 左州 (Tsatsou, phu13 tsa54 tsou54): in Longlin 龍臨, Ande 安德, Sanhe 三合, and Wuping 武平 townships.
Fu: in Quyang 渠洋 township.

Climate

Transportation
The city has one railway station, Jingxi railway station.

References

External links
 

 
Counties and cities in Baise